Přes přísný zákaz dotýká se sněhu (English: Over a strict ban on touching snow) is comedy play from present-day which he written dramatic, actor and director Antonín Procházka in 2003.

The play had a premiere 25 October 2003 in Plzeň's J. K. Tyl Theatre.

Story
Main hero is Eda - white horse just released from prison which pass a memory on him. His wife, Nina, found a lover, but Nina's lover also likes Eda. Eda is after supervision the social worker which he helps with adaptation in the freedom.

Productions

Divadlo J. K. Tyla
Directed by Antonín Procházka. The play had premiere at 25 October, 2003 in J. K. Tyl Theatre]
Erik .... Viktor Limr
Nina .... Štěpánka Křesťanová
Eda .... Antonín Procházka
Edita Kudlanová .... Monika Švábová
Ester Kožená .... Andrea Černá
Jarda aka Window .... Michal Štrich
Cop .... Michal Štěrba
Russian Guy .... Vilém Dubnička
Naděžda .... Taťána Kupcová

Divadlo Pod Palmovkou
Directed by Antonín Procházka like a guest. The play had premiere at 15 and 17 January, 2004 in Palmovka theatre, Prague.
Erik .... Jan Teplý
Nina .... Miroslava Pleštilová
Eda .... Jan Moravec
Edita Kudlanová .... Kateřina Macháčková or Marcela Nohýnková
Ester Kožená .... Zuzana Slavíková
Jarda the Window .... Ivo Kubečka
Cop .... Otto Rošetzký
Russian Guy .... Radek Zima or Daniel Bambas
Naděžda .... Petra Kotmelová

Article's Notes
SSM - Socialistic Alliance of Youths
Nusel Bridge
Václav Špála
Franz Kafka
Uzhhorod
Božena Němcová
Radetzky March

References

External links
Play in Youtube
Palmovka Theatre
Eastern Bohemian Theatre
Critique by I-Divadlo
J. K. Tyl Theatre

Czech plays
Comedy plays
Plays by Antonín Procházka
Off-Broadway plays
2003 plays